The Willwood Formation is a sedimentary sequence deposited during the late Paleocene to early Eocene, or Clarkforkian, Wasatchian and Bridgerian in the NALMA classification.

Description 
It consists of fine grained clastic rocks (mudstone and shale) interbedded with medium grained clastic rocks (sandstone) and sporadic conglomerates. The formation underlies portions of the Bighorn Basin of Big Horn, Hot Springs, Park and Washakie counties of Wyoming.

Dating 
Radiometric dating of volcanic tuffs, combined with comparisons with other formations using magnetostratigraphy, using numerous samples from various levels of the formation suggest an age range of 55 – 52 million years ago, placing the Paleocene-Eocene boundary near the base of the formation.

Fossil content 
Trace fossils have been found in the Willwood Formation. Fossil birds include Gastornis, Neocathartes and Paracathartes. A fossil alligatorid, namely Orthogenysuchus, was also found in this formation.

Mammals

Afrotheres

Apatotheres

Bats

Cimolestans

Eulipotyphlans

Ferae

Leptictids

Marsupials

Multituberculates

Primatomorphs

Rodents

Ungulates

Reptiles

Birds

Crocodilians

Squamates

Testudines

Amphibians

Fish

Invertebrates

Invertebrate ichnotaxa

Gastropods

Plants

Wasatchian correlations

See also 

 List of fossiliferous stratigraphic units in Wyoming
 Paleontology in Wyoming
 Tatman Formation
 Wasatch Formation

References

Bibliography 

 
 
 
 
 
 
 
 
 
 
 
 
 
 
 
 
 
 
 
 
 
 
 
 

Geologic formations of the United States
Paleocene Series of North America
Eocene Series of North America
Paleogene geology of Wyoming
Thanetian Stage
Ypresian Stage
Bridgerian
Clarkforkian
Wasatchian
Limestone formations
Mudstone formations
Shale formations of the United States
Sandstone formations of the United States
Conglomerate formations
Fluvial deposits
Lacustrine deposits
Ichnofossiliferous formations
Fossiliferous stratigraphic units of North America
Paleontology in Wyoming